Jakub Węgrzynkiewicz (July 21, 1928 in Szczyrk – June 20, 2006 in Szczyrk) was a Polish ski jumper who competed from 1952 to 1957. He finished 33rd in the individual large hill event at the 1952 Winter Olympics in Oslo, which was his best career finish.

References

1928 births
2006 deaths
Polish male ski jumpers
Olympic ski jumpers of Poland
Ski jumpers at the 1952 Winter Olympics
People from Bielsko County
Sportspeople from Silesian Voivodeship
20th-century Polish people